The 2013 Men's Hockey Hamburg Masters was the eighteenth edition of the Hamburg Masters, consisting of a series of test matches. It was be held in Hamburg, Germany, from July 25 to 28, 2013, and featured four of the top nations in men's field hockey.

Competition format
The tournament featured the national teams of England, Ireland, the Netherlands, and the hosts, Germany, competing in a round-robin format, with each team playing each other once. Three points were awarded for a win, one for a draw, and none for a loss.

Results

Matches

Statistics

Goalscorers

References

2013
Men's
2013 in German sport
2013 in Irish sport
2013 in English sport
2013 in Dutch sport
Sport in Hamburg
July 2013 sports events in Germany